Fāʾiz is a male Arabic name meaning "successful " and "winner" overflowing, plenty.

It is derived from its root word Faʾz (  which means "victorious".

People with the name
 Faiz Mohammad Katib Hazara (1862/63–1929), a Hazara historian, writer and intellectual
 Faiz El-Ghusein (1883–1968), an official of the Turkish Government
 Faiz Ahmad Faiz (1911–1984), a Pakistani Urdu poet
 Syed Faiz-ul Hassan Shah (1911–1984), a Pakistani Islamic religious scholar
 Haji Faiz Mohammed (1932-), an Afghan man who was held in extrajudicial detention in the United States's Guantanamo Bay detention camps, in Cuba.
 Faiz Ahmad (1946–1986), an Afghan Marxist–Leninist
 Faiz al-Hasan, Bangladeshi politician
 Faiz Karizi (1953-), an Afghan singer
 Faiz Ali Faiz (1962–), a Pakistani qawwali singer
 Faiz-ul-Aqtab Siddiqi (1967–), a British Muslim scholar
 Faiz Mohammed Ahmed Al Kandari (1975-), a Kuwaiti citizen who has been detained in Guantanamo Bay since 2002
 Valiullah Faiz Mahdavi (1978–2006), an Iranian political prisoner
 Ahmed Faiz (1979–), a Saudi Arabian long jumper
 Faiz Khaleed (1980–), a Malaysian military dentist, astronaut
 Faiz Fazal (1980–), an Indian cricketer
 Muhammad Faiz Nur Khalil (2008)

Nobility and royalty 
The name is particularly common among the royal and noble houses of South Asia.

Sovereigns:

 Al-Faiz (1149–1160), a Caliph of the Fatimid dynasty
 Nawab Faiz Ali Khan (Banganapalle), Nawab of  Baganapalle (1686–1759)
 Nawab Faiz Ali Khan, Nawab of Jhajjar
 Nawab Faiz Muhammad Khan, Nawab of Dadri
 Emir Faiz Muhammad Khan, Emir of Khairpur (r.1894-1909)
 Emir Faiz Muhammad Khan II, Emir of Khairpur (r.1935-1947)
 Nawab Faiz Talb Khan, Nawab of Junagadh
 Nawab Faiz Muhammad Khan, Nawab of Bhopal (r.1742-1777)
 Nawab Faiz Talb Khan, Nawab of  Pataudi 
 Nawab Faiz'Ullah Khan, Nawab of Rampur

Princes and nobles:
 Tengku Muhammad Faiz Petra, the Crown Prince of Kelantan
 Nawab Faiz ud Din Khan, Emir of Paigah
 Faiz Beg Najm-i-Sani 
 Nawab Faiz Ali Khan Bahadur of Kotah
 Nawab Mir Faiz Ali Khan of Hyderabad
 Sahibzada Faiz Muhammad Khan of Tonk
 Mirza Faiz'ullah Beg Khan Bahadur of Loharu
 Faiz'ullah Khan of Malerkotla son of Rasul Khan of Malerkotla
 Faiz Muhammad Khan of Malerkotla son of Kasim Khan of Malerkotla
 Faiz Muhammad Khan of Malerkotla son of Mehr Ilahi Khan of Malerkotla
 Faiz Muhammad Khan of Malerkotla son of Imam Ali Khan of Malerkotla
 Faiz Muhammad Khan of Malerkotla son of Mansab Khan of Malerkotla
 Faiz Muhammad Khan of Malerkotla son of Barkat Ali Khan of Malerkotla
 Faiz Ali Khan of Malerkotla son of Shadal Khan of Malerkotla
 Faiz Muhammad Khan of Malerkotla son of Hakim Khan of Malerkotla
 Faiz Muhammad Khan of Malerkotla son of Karim Khan of Malerkotla
 Khan Sahib Faiz' Ullah of Malerkotla son of Sahibzada Fateh Khan of Malerkotla
 Khan Sahib Faiz Talib Khan of Malerkotla son of Sahibzada Fateh Khan of Malerkotla
 Khan Sahib Muhammad Faiz Ali Khan of Malerkotla son of Sahibzada Himmat Khan of Malerkotla
 Nawabzada Fateh Faiz bin Jung of Paigah
 Mian Faiz Muhammad Khan of Bhopal State b.1840
 Sahibzada Faiz Rashid Khan of Bhopal
 Sahibzada Faiz Muhammad Khan of Bhopal

See also
Kamen Rider 555
Syed Faiz-ul Hassan Shah

References

Arabic masculine given names